Abouna, also abuna, is a religious title carried by head of the Maronite, Coptic, Ethiopian, Eritrean, and other Eastern Orthodox Christian churches.

Abouna may refer to:


People with the surname
Andraos Abouna (1943–2010), Chaldean Catholic titular bishop of Hirta and the auxiliary bishop of the Chaldean Catholic Patriarchate of Babylon
 Eliya Abuna (1862-1955), Bishop of the Assyrian Church of the East and the Chaldean Catholic Church.
 Hirmis Aboona (1940-2009), Iraqi Assyrian historian.*Jean-Patrick Abouna (born 1990), Cameroonian football player
Jean-Patrick Abouna (born 1990), Cameroonian football player
 Thierry Modo Abouna (born 1981), Cameroonian football player
 Yaqob Abuna (d. 1553), Syrian Metropolitan of India.

People with the title abuna
Abouna Gabriel Abdel El-Metgaly (1918–1978), Egyptian hegumen of the Coptic Orthodox Church
Abouna Matta El Meskeen or Father Matta El Meskeen (1919–2006), Coptic Orthodox monk
Abouna Menassa Elkomos Youhanna (1899–1930), Coptic priest, historian and theologian

Other uses
Abouna (film), a 2002 film by Chadian director Mahamat Saleh Haroun